Richtersiidae is a family of tardigrades belonging to the order Parachela.

Genera:
 Adorybiotus Maucci & Ramazzotti, 1981
 Diaforobiotus Guidetti, Rebecchi, Bertolani, Jönsson, Kristensen & Cesari, 2016
 Richtersius Pilato & Binda, 1989

References

Parachaela
Tardigrade families